This is a list of monuments in Rolpa District, Nepal as officially recognized by and available through the website of the Department of Archaeology, Nepal. Rolpa is a district of Lumbini Province and is located in midwestern Nepal. Hindu temples are the main attraction of this district.

List of monuments

|}

See also 
 List of monuments in Lumbini Province
 List of monuments in Nepal

References 

Rolpa